The Macintosh Quadra 900 is a personal computer designed, manufactured, and sold by Apple Computer from October 1991 to May 1992. It was introduced alongside the Quadra 700 as the first computers in the Quadra family of Macintosh computers using the Motorola 68040 processor.  It is also the first computer from Apple to be housed in an 18.6 inch (47 cm) tall mid-tower form factor, which by 1991 had gained momentum with PC manufacturers as a suitable design for departmental servers. 

The Quadra 900 had a short lifespan; it was discontinued about six months after the first shipments in favor of the more powerful Quadra 950.

Hardware  
The Quadra 900 was more expandable than the Quadra 700 but cost US$7,200. The Quadra 900 could be upgraded to 256 megabytes of RAM, an astronomical amount for the time, when a typical midrange system would come equipped with 2–4 MB. The standard, as-shipped configuration for the 900 was 4 MB. The high RAM and storage capacity, along with the expandability of five NuBus 90 slots and fast 25 MHz processor, made it a very useful computer for scientific or design work. The mid-tower case design features a single 5.25-inch drive bay initially intended to hold a tape backup drive, but was often repurposed to hold a CD-ROM or SyQuest drive during the model's operational lifespan.  Featuring 16 slots for 30-pin SIMMs (installed in groups of four), Quadra 900s with full complements of RAM were exceedingly rare due to the high cost (many thousands of dollars) of the SIMMs at the time.

A new three-mode key-lock system on the front panel can be set to Off, On, and Secure. When set to Off, the machine can't be powered up. In Secure mode, the floppy drive and ADB port are disabled, offering a degree of local protection.

System 7.0.1 was included and supports up to Mac OS 8.1. It is the earliest Macintosh model with the ability to run Mac OS 8.

Specifications 
 Processor: 25 MHz Motorola 68040
 Processor Cache: 8 KB Level 1
 Bus Speed: 25 MHz
 Hard Drive: 160 or 400 MB
 Media drives: 1.44 MB floppy drive with one 5.25" SCSI drive bay available
 Software: Mac OS 7.0.1 - 8.1
 Logicboard RAM: None
 Maximum RAM: 256 MB
 Type of RAM: 30-pin SIMM (16 slots)
 Minimum RAM Speed: 80 ns
 Interleaving Support: No
 Graphics: Integrated
 Display Connection: DB-15
 Graphics Memory: 1 MB standard, upgradable to 2 MB via 4 VRAM slots
 Expansion Slots: 5 - NuBus, 1 - PDS
 Hard Drive Bus: SCSI
 Backup Battery: 3.6 V Lithium
 Max Watts: 303 W
 Ports: AAUI-15 Ethernet, 1 ADB, DB-25 SCSI, 2 Serial, 3.5-mm mono input jack, 3.5-mm stereo output jack

Timeline

References

External links

 Everymac.com - Macintosh Quadra 900 specifications
 Dale Adams on Quadra 700 & 900 On-board Video Capabilities

900
Quadra 900
Quadra 900
Quadra 900
Quadra 900
Computer-related introductions in 1991